Bistrița is a city in Romania.

Bistrița may also refer to several other entities in Romania:
 Bistrița-Năsăud County
 Bistrița Bârgăului, a commune in Bistrița-Năsăud County
 Bistrița, a village in Hinova Commune, Mehedinţi County
 Bistrița, a village in Alexandru cel Bun Commune, Neamț County
 Bistrița, a village in Costești Commune, Vâlcea County
 Berești-Bistrița, a commune in Bacău County
 Bistrița Nouă, a village administered by Piatra-Olt town, Olt County
 Bistrița Monastery, Neamț County
 Bistrița Mountains, mountain ranges in northern central Romania
 rivers in Romania:
Bistrița, a small tributary of the Iza in Maramureș County 
Bistrița (Tismana), a tributary of the Tismana in Gorj County
Bistrița (Olt), a tributary of the Olt in Vâlcea County
Bistrița (Siret), a tributary of the Siret in Bistrița-Năsăud, Suceava, Neamț and Bacău Counties
Bistrița (Someș), a tributary of the Șieu in Bistrița-Năsăud County

See also
 Bistrica (disambiguation)
 Bistritsa (disambiguation)
 Bystrica (disambiguation)
 Bistritz (disambiguation)
 Bystrzyca (disambiguation)
 Feistritz (disambiguation)
 Bistra (disambiguation)